The Selling of Vince D'Angelo is a 1982 American short television film directed by and starring Danny DeVito.

Cast
Danny DeVito as Vince D'Angelo
Tim Thomerson as Pete Harrison
Rhea Perlman as Vince's Wife
Jason Hervey as Vince's son
Joe Santos as Vince's Left Hand Man
Vincent Schiavelli as Vince's Right Hand Man

References

External links
 

1982 films
1980s English-language films
American short films
1982 short films
Short films directed by Danny DeVito